Negro Head Corner is an unincorporated community in Woodruff County, Arkansas, United States, located about  north of Augusta.

The area is named for an oak sculpture of a Black man's head that was once displayed at the corner of a farm near the crossroads. It was carved by Wade Antney, who farmed the land first as an enslaved person and then later as the owner. It has been theorized that the sculpture represented Legba, the loa of crossroads in Haitian Vodou.

References

Unincorporated communities in Woodruff County, Arkansas
Unincorporated communities in Arkansas